Isabel Marie Gose (born 9 May 2002) is a German swimmer. She competed in the women's 4 × 200 metre freestyle relay event at the 2018 European Aquatics Championships, winning the bronze medal.

References

External links
 

2002 births
Living people
German female swimmers
Place of birth missing (living people)
German female freestyle swimmers
European Aquatics Championships medalists in swimming
European Championships (multi-sport event) bronze medalists
Swimmers at the 2020 Summer Olympics
Olympic swimmers of Germany
21st-century German women